The Astor Trophy is a women's team golf tournament between teams of amateurs golfers from Great Britain and Ireland, Australia, Canada, New Zealand and South Africa. It has been played every four years since 1959. From its foundation until 2007 it was called the Commonwealth Trophy. South Africa did not compete from 1963 to 1991. While it was called the Commonwealth Trophy, Irish golfers were not eligible. The trophy was presented by Nancy Astor, Viscountess Astor.

Format
Each team plays the other four teams. Two matches are played each day, the tournament lasting five days. Each match is contested over one day with foursomes in the morning and singles in the afternoon.

In 2019 there were four players in each team. Each match consisted of two foursomes and four singles. Previously there were five players in each team and each match consisted of two foursomes and five singles. The winner of the match receives 1 point while in a tied match each side receives ½ point. The cup is decided by the number of team matches won. In the event of a tie the order is decided by the number of individual matches won, including a half point for each halved match. If the team are still tied then the cup is tied.

Results

South Africa did not compete from 1963 to 1991.

Source:

Teams

Australia
1959 Pat Borthwick, Burtta Cheney, Joan Fletcher, Mardi Mair, Margaret Masters
1963 Pat Borthwick, Diana Cross, Joan Fletcher, Margaret Masters, Judith Percy
1967 Carole Blair, Barbara Coulson, Betty Dalgleish, Marea Hickey, Dianna Thomas
1971 Lindy Goggin, June Howe, Dianna Thomas, Sandra Williams, Rhys Wright
1975 Anne Alletson, Vicki Jellis, Jane Lock, Sandra McCaw, Marea Parsons
1979 Jane Crafter, Edwina Kennedy, Jane Lock, Sandra McCaw, Karen Permezel
1983 Louise Briers, Corinne Dibnah, Lindy Goggin, Edwina Kennedy, Diane Pavich
1987 Louise Briers, Lindy Goggin, Edwina Kennedy, Ericka Maxwell, Alison Munt
1991 Louise Briers, Wendy Doolan, Sarah Gautrey, Edwina Kennedy, Jane Shearwood
1995 Tanya Holl, Anne-Marie Knight, Kate MacIntosh, Allison Wheelhouse, Simone Williams
1999 Helen Beatty, Tamie Durdin, Sandy Grimshaw, Rebecca Stevenson, Lindsey Wright
2003 Misun Cho, Sarah Kemp, Sarah-Jane Kenyon, Rochelle Miles, Anna Parsons
2007 Emma Bennett, Frances Bondad, Stephanie Na, Helen Oh, Sunny Park
2011 Breanna Elliott, Emma de Groot, Minjee Lee, Ashley Ona, Cathleen Santoso
2015 Gennai Goodwin, Hannah Green, Becky Kay, Jenny Lee, Shelly Shin
2019 Amelia Grohn, Kirsty Hodgkins, Emily Mahar, Stacey White

Source:

Canada
1959 Judy Darling, Mary Gay, Rae Milligan, Roma Neundorf, Marlene Streit
1963 Betty Cole, Judy Darling, Gayle Hitchens, Rae Milligan, Marlene Streit
1967 Helene Gagnon, Gail Hitchens, Gail Harvey Moore, Marilyn Palmer, Marlene Streit
1971 Gayle Borthwick, Jocelyne Bourassa, Betty Cole, Gail Moore, Marilyn Palmer
1975 Susie Conklin, Sue Higgs, Liz Hoffman, Debbie Savoy, Dale Shaw
1979 Michele Guilbault, Gail Moore, Marilyn O'Connor, Marlene Streit, Stacey West
1983 Dawn Coe, Patty Grant, Cheryll Gibb, Mary Ann Hayward, Marlene Streit
1987 Gail Anderson, Audrey Bendick, Cathy Burton, Judy Medlicott, Jennifer Wyatt
1991 Evelyn Biron, Marie-Josee Desbiens, Lorie Kane, Mary Ann Lapointe, Terrill Samuel
1995 Kelly Doohan, Anna-Jane Eathorne, Tracey Lipp, Kareen Qually, Aileen Robertson
1999 Isabelle Blais, Laura Henderson, Mary Ann Lapointe, Jessica Luciuk, Kareen Qually
2003 Veronique Drouin, Mary Ann Lapointe, Laura Matthews, Eom-ji Park, Terrill Samuel
2007 Isabelle Blais, Laura Henderson, Jessica Luciuk, Laura Matthews, Kareen Qually
2011 Rebecca Lee-Bentham, Anne-Catherine Tanguay, Nicole Vandermade, Jessica Wallace, Christine Wong
2015 Michelle Kim, Naomi Ko, Alisha Lau, Jaclyn Lee, Grace St-Germain
2019 Noémie Paré, Mary Parsons, Brooke Rivers, Emily Zhu

Great Britain (and Ireland)
1959 Bridget Jackson, Elizabeth Price, Janette Robertson, Frances Smith, Marley Spearman
1963 Julia Greenhalgh, Ruth Porter, Frances Smith, Marley Spearman, Sheila Vaughan
1967 Liz Chadwick, Ann Irvin, Bridget Jackson, Dinah Oxley, Vivien Saunders
1971 Mary Everard, Jill Hutton, Dinah Oxley, Belle Robertson, Michelle Walker
1975 Julia Greenhalgh, Ann Irvin, Jenny Lee-Smith, Tegwen Perkins, Anne Stant
1979 Sue Hedges, Maureen Madill, Tegwen Perkins, Vicki Rawlings, Gillian Stewart
1983 Jane Connachan, Gillian Stewart, Vicki Thomas, Jill Thornhill, Claire Waite
1987 Janet Collingham, Karen Davies, Susan Shapcott, Vicki Thomas, Jill Thornhill
1991 Elaine Farquharson, Linzi Fletcher, Julie Hall, Catriona Lambert, Vicki Thomas
1995 Julie Hall, Mhairi McKay, Janice Moodie, Alison Rose, Lisa Walton
1999 Kim Andrew, Fiona Brown, Rebecca Hudson, Anne Laing, Becky Morgan
2003 Anna Highgate, Lynn Kenny, Anne Laing, Shelley McKevitt, Kate Phillips
2007 Krystle Caithness, Naomi Edwards, Breanne Loucks, Melissa Reid, Kerry Smith
2011 Amy Boulden, Holly Clyburn, Kelsey MacDonald, Pamela Pretswell, Kelly Tidy
2015 Hayley Davis, Connie Jaffrey, Bronte Law, Charlotte Thomas, Chloe Williams
2019 Alice Hewson, Lily May Humphreys, Olivia Mehaffey, Emily Toy

Source:

New Zealand
1959 Nicki Campbell, Susan Grigg, VS Land, Jean Mangan, Aileen Nash
1963 Susan Grigg, Pat Harrison, Jean Mangan, Natalie White, Una Wickham
1967 Heather Booth, Wendy Bryant, Jane Little, Glennis Taylor, Natalie White
1971 Dawn Blake, Heather Booth, Marilyn Smith, Glennis Taylor, Jean Whitehead
1975 Gillian Bannan, Sue Bishop, Sue Boag, Liz Douglas, Frances Pere
1979 Janice Arnold, Liz Douglas, Cherry Kingham, Brenda Rhodes, Heather Ryan
1983 Janice Arnold, Liz Douglas, Debbie Randell, Brenda Rhodes, Jan Scandrett
1987 Jan Cooke, Liz Douglas, Tracey Hanson, Brenda Ormsby, Debbie Smith
1991 Lisa Aldridge, Jan Higgins, Marnie McGuire, Kerryn Starr, Annette Stott
1995 Shelley Duncan, Catherine Knight, Gina Scott, Pam Sowden, Kerryn Starr
1999 Lisa Aldridge, Wendy Hawkes, Tina Howard, Catherine Knight, Pam Sowden
2003 Enu Chung, Penny Newbrook, Sarah Nicholson, Jenny Park, Stacey Tate
2007 Tammy Clelland, Larissa Eruera, Yeon Song Kim, Dasom Lee, Penny Smith
2011 Julianne Alvarez, Chantelle Cassidy, Cecilia Cho, Lydia Ko, Emily Perry
2015 Julianne Alvarez, Alanna Campbell, Chantelle Cassidy, Munchin Keh, Wenyung Keh
2019 Julianne Alvarez, Amelia Garvey, Wenyung Keh, Carmen Lim

Source:

South Africa
1959 Jeanette Burd, Mary Clemence, Rita Easton, Jackie Mercer, Jean Tindall
1995 Claudette Beukes, Lara Lipworth, Sanet Marais, Barbara Plant, Wendy Warrington
1999 not known
2003 Esme Behrens, Lee-Anne Pace, Ashleigh Simon, Tanica van As, Sandra Winter
2007 Kelli Shean, Ashleigh Simon, Bertine Strauss, Gina Switala, Iliska Verwey
2011 Tiffany Avern-Taplin, Henriëtte Frylinch, Bertine Strauss, Iliska Verwey, Kim Williams
2015 Lora Assad, Michaela Fletcher, Eleonora Galletti, Ivanna Samu, Bertine Strauss
2019 Kiera Floyd, Caitlyn Tate Macnab, Kaleigh Telfer, Kaylah Williams

Similar events
In 1973, Australia hosted a similar tournament, the Women's International Series, at Royal Sydney, played from 27 to 31 October. Five teams competed, Australia, Canada, Great Britain and Ireland, Japan and New Zealand. Australia won the event with 3 wins ahead of New Zealand.

Australia: Gayle Flynn, Lindy Goggin, Vicki Jellis, Jane Lock
Canada: Liz Hoffman, Marilyn Palmer, Dale Shaw, Barbara Turnbull
Great Britain and Ireland: Linda Denison-Pender, Mary Everard, Ann Irvin, Carol Le Feuvre, Maisey Mooney
Japan Takako Kiyomoto, Michiko Tachibana, Machiko Yamada, Shinako Yoshimochi
New Zealand: Gillian Bannon, Sue Boag, Sue Hamilton, Frances Pere, Sue Ritchie

References

Team golf tournaments
Amateur golf tournaments
Recurring sporting events established in 1959